Helsingborgs IF had a disappointing season, losing to Sarajevo in the UEFA Europa League and only just finished in the top half, causing the resignation of coach Bosse Nilsson. The club's marquee player Henrik Larsson chose to retire from professional football aged 38, taking over Landskrona as manager.

Squad

Goalkeepers
  Daniel Andersson
  Pär Hansson

Defenders
  Adama Tamboura
  Andreas Landgren
  Markus Holgersson
  Christoffer Andersson
  Erik Wahlstedt
  Marcus Nilsson
  Joel Ekstrand

Midfielders
  Hannu Patronen
  May Mahlangu
  Fredrik Svanbäck
  Erik Sundin
  Marcus Lantz
  Ólafur Ingi Skúlason
  Marcus Bergholtz
  René Makondele
  Mathias Unkuri
  Isaac Chansa
  Yakubu Alfa

Attackers
  Rafael Porcellis
  Henrik Larsson
  Rasmus Jönsson

Allsvenskan

Matches

 Helsingborg-IFK Göteborg 1-0
 1-0 Marcus Lantz 
 GAIS-Helsingborg 1-4
 0-1 Rasmus Jönsson 
 1-1 Tommy Lycén 
 1-2 Erik Sundin 
 1-3 René Makondele 
 1-4 Henrik Larsson 
 Helsingborg-Hammarby 1-0
 1-0 Christoffer Andersson 
 Örebro-Helsingborg 2-0
 1-0 Kim Olsen 
 2-0 Emra Tahirović 
 Helsingborg-Halmstad 1-3
 1-0 Marcus Holgersson 
 1-1 Anselmo 
 1-2 Joe Sise 
 1-3 Mikael Rosén 
 AIK-Helsingborg 0-3
 0-1 Rasmus Jönsson 
 0-2 Rasmus Jönsson 
 0-3 Rasmus Jönsson 
 Helsingborg-Malmö FF 1-0
 1-0 Henrik Larsson 
 Brommapojkarna-Helsingborg 0-3
 0-1 Marcus Holgersson 
 0-2 Olof Guterstam 
 0-3 Henrik Larsson 
 Helsingborg-Trelleborg 2-2
 1-0 Christoffer Andersson 
 2-0 René Makondele 
 2-1 Max Fuxberg 
 2-2 Fisnik Shala 
 Häcken-Helsingborg 3-0
 1-0 Mathias Ranégie 
 2-0 Mathias Ranégie 
 3-0 Jonas Henriksson 
 Helsingborg-Örgryte 3-1
 1-0 Marcus Lantz 
 2-0 Erik Sundin 
 2-1 Daniel Leinar 
 3-1 Mathias Unkuri 
 Kalmar FF-Helsingborg 2-0
 1-0 Daniel Sobralense 
 2-0 Rasmus Elm 
 Djurgården-Helsingborg 2-1
 1-0 Patrik Haginge 
 2-0 Sebastian Rajalakso 
 2-1 Rasmus Jönsson 
 Helsingborg-Elfsborg 3-2
 1-0 Christoffer Andersson 
 2-0 Rasmus Jönsson 
 2-1 Emir Bajrami 
 2-2 Emir Bajrami 
 3-2 Rasmus Jönsson 
 Gefle-Helsingborg 0-2
 0-1 Christoffer Andersson 
 0-2 Erik Sundin 
 Helsingborg-Gefle 2-0
 1-0 Henrik Larsson 
 2-0 Marcus Lantz 
 Hammarby-Helsingborg 1-2
 0-1 René Makondele 
 0-2 Erik Sundin 
 1-2 Andreas Dahl 
 Helsingborg-Örebro 0-1
 0-1 Kim Olsen 
 IFK Göteborg-Helsingborg 2-2
 1-0 Sebastian Eriksson 
 2-0 Erik Lund 
 2-1 René Makondele 
 2-2 René Makondele 
 Helsingborg-GAIS 0-1
 0-1 Eyjólfur Héðinsson 
 Helsingborg-Brommapojkarna 0-1
 0-1 Pablo Piñones-Arce 
 Halmstad-Helsingborg 2-1
 1-0 Michael Görlitz 
 2-0 Anselmo 
 2-1 Marcus Lantz 
 Helsingborg-AIK 3-2
 1-0 Andreas Landgren 
 2-0 Henrik Larsson 
 2-1 Jos Hooiveld 
 3-1 Henrik Larsson 
 3-2 Dulee Johnson 
 Trelleborg-Helsingborg 4-2
 0-1 Rasmus Jönsson 
 0-2 Christoffer Andersson 
 1-2 Andreas Wihlborg 
 2-2 Joakim Sjöhage 
 3-2 Joakim Sjöhage 
 4-2 Fredrik Jensen 
 Helsingborg-Häcken 1-0
 1-0 Henrik Larsson 
 Örgryte-Helsingborg 3-0
 1-0 Álvaro Santos 
 2-0 Álvaro Santos 
 3-0 Álvaro Santos 
 Helsingborg-Kalmar FF 1-1
 1-0 René Makondele 
 1-1 Ricardo Santos 
 Helsingborg-Djurgården 0-2
 0-1 Yosif Ayuba 
 0-2 Prince Ikpe Ekong 
 Elfsborg-Helsingborg 1-0
 1-0 James Keene

Topscorers
  Rasmus Jönsson 8
  Henrik Larsson 7
  René Makondele 5
  Marcus Lantz 4
  Erik Sundin 4

Helsingborgs IF seasons
Helsingborg